Donna Maree Hilton (born 28 February 1968) is a former judoka from New Zealand. She represented New Zealand at the 1990 Commonwealth Games in Auckland, New Zealand, and at the 1992 Summer Olympics in Barcelona, Spain.

References

1968 births
Living people
Judoka at the 1992 Summer Olympics
Olympic judoka of New Zealand
Judoka at the 1990 Commonwealth Games
Commonwealth Games competitors for New Zealand
20th-century New Zealand women
New Zealand female judoka